Promachus consanguineus is a species of robber flies (insects in the family Asilidae). It was first described by French entomologist Pierre-Justin-Marie Macquart in 1838. It is endemic to the eastern Canary Islands (Fuerteventura, Lanzarote, La Graciosa).

References

External links

 
 Promachus consanguineus - Banco de Datos de Biodiversidad de Canarias

Asilidae
Insects described in 1838